The 1832–33 United States House of Representatives elections were held on various dates in various states between July 2, 1832 and October 7, 1833. Each state set its own date for its elections to the House of Representatives before the first session of the 23rd United States Congress convened on December 2, 1833. They were held concurrently with the 1832 presidential election, in which Democrat Andrew Jackson was re-elected. The congressional reapportionment based on the 1830 United States Census increased the size of the House to 240 seats.

The Jacksonians gained 17 seats, picking up several new seats in districts that were created by the reapportionment, with the rival National Republican Party losing three seats.

Economic issues were key factors in this election: Southern agricultural districts reacted angrily to the passage of the Tariff of 1832, which led to the Nullification Crisis. President Andrew Jackson and the Jacksonians showed a distrust for the banking sector, particularly the central Second Bank of the United States, which was strongly supported by the rival Anti-Jacksonian Party.

The third-party Anti-Masonic Party, based on anti-Masonry, gained eight seats, and Nullifier Party, a John C. Calhoun-led states' rights party that supported South Carolina in the Nullification Crisis, picked up eight of the nine representatives in South Carolina's delegation.

The House initially elected Andrew Stevenson as Speaker, but he resigned from the House after President Jackson appointed him as U.S. Minister to the United Kingdom: Anti-Jacksonian Representatives subsequently elected John Bell as Speaker over James Polk.

Election summaries 
Following the 1830 Census, 27 new seats were apportioned, with 4 states losing 1 seat each, 8 states having no change, and the remaining 12 states gaining between 1 and 6 seats.

Special elections

22nd Congress 

|-
! 
| George Edward Mitchell
|  | Jacksonian
| 18221826 1829
|  | Incumbent died June 28, 1832.New member elected October 1, 1832.Jacksonian hold.Successor seated December 3, 1832.
| nowrap | 

|-
! 
| Charles Clement Johnston
|  | Jacksonian
| 1831
|  | Incumbent died June 17, 1832.New member  elected in 1832.Jacksonian hold.Successor seated December 12, 1832.
| nowrap | 

|-
! 
| Jonathan Hunt
|  | Anti-Jacksonian
| 1827
|  | Incumbent died May 15, 1832.New member  elected January 1, 1833 on the fourth ballot.Anti-Jacksonian hold.Winner also elected the same day to the next term, see below.Successor seated January 21, 1833.
| nowrap | ::::

|-
! 
| Philip Doddridge
|  | Anti-Jacksonian
| 1829
|  | Incumbent died November 19, 1832.New member elected January 1, 1833.Jacksonian gain.Successor seated January 21, 1833.
| nowrap | 

|}

23rd Congress 

|-
! 
| John Randolph
|  | Jacksonian
| 18151817 18191825 18271829 1833
|  | Incumbent died May 24, 1833.New member  elected in August 1833.Jacksonian hold.
| nowrap | 

|-
! 
| Joel B. Sutherland
|  | Jacksonian
| 1826
|  | Incumbent member-elect resigned March 3, 1833, to become a judge, but then resigned that position to run for this seat.Incumbent re-elected October 8, 1833.
| nowrap | 

|}

Alabama 

|-
! 

|-
! 

|-
! 

|-
! 

|-
! 

|}

Connecticut 

Connecticut kept its apportionment at 6 seats and elected its members at-large April 11, 1833.

|-
! rowspan=6 | 
| Noyes Barber
|  | Anti-Jacksonian
| 1821
| Incumbent re-elected.
| rowspan=6 nowrap | 

|-
| William W. Ellsworth
|  | Anti-Jacksonian
| 1829
| Incumbent re-elected.

|-
| Ebenezer Young
|  | Anti-Jacksonian
| 1829
| Incumbent re-elected.

|-
| Jabez W. Huntington
|  | Anti-Jacksonian
| 1829
| Incumbent re-elected.

|-
| Ralph I. Ingersoll
|  | Anti-Jacksonian
| 1825
|  | Incumbent retired.New member elected.Anti-Jacksonian hold.

|-
| William L. Storrs
|  | Anti-Jacksonian
| 1829
|  | Incumbent retired.New member elected.Anti-Jacksonian hold.

|}

Delaware 

|-
! 

|}

Georgia 

Georgia now had 9 seats, having gained 2 seats in reapportionment, and elected its members at-large on October 1, 1832.

|-
! rowspan=9 | 
| James M. Wayne
|  | Jacksonian
| 1828
| Incumbent re-elected.
| rowspan=9 nowrap | 

|-
| Richard Henry Wilde
|  | Jacksonian
| 18141816 1824 1826 1827 
| Incumbent re-elected.

|-
| Wiley Thompson
|  | Jacksonian
| 1820
|  | Incumbent retired.New member elected.Jacksonian hold.

|-
| Augustin S. Clayton
|  | Jacksonian
| 1831 
| Incumbent re-elected.

|-
| Thomas F. Foster
|  | Jacksonian
| 1828
| Incumbent re-elected.

|-
| Henry G. Lamar
|  | Jacksonian
| 1829 
|  | Incumbent lost re-election.New member elected.Jacksonian hold.

|-
| Daniel Newnan
|  | Jacksonian
| 1830
|  | Incumbent lost re-election.New member elected.Jacksonian hold.

|-
| colspan=3 | New seat
|  | New seat.New member elected.Jacksonian gain.

|-
| colspan=3 | New seat
|  | New seat.New member elected.Jacksonian gain.

|}

Illinois 

Illinois gained two seats in reapportionment and elected its three members on August 6, 1832.

|-
! 
| colspan=3 | None 
|  | New seat.New member elected.Jacksonian gain.
| nowrap | 

|-
! 
| colspan=3 | None 
|  | New seat.New member elected.Jacksonian gain.
| nowrap | 

|-
! 
| Joseph Duncan
|  | Jacksonian
| 1826
| Incumbent re-elected.
| nowrap | 

|}

Indiana 

|-
! 

|-
! 

|-
! 

|-
! 

|-
! 

|-
! 

|-
! 

|}

Kentucky 

|-
! 

|-
! 

|-
! 

|-
! 

|-
! 

|-
! 

|-
! 

|-
! 

|-
! 

|-
! 

|-
! 

|-
! 

|-
! 

|}

Louisiana 

|-
! 

|-
! 

|-
! 

|}

Maine 

Maine held its elections September 9, 1833.

|-
! 

|-
! 

|-
! 

|-
! 

|-
! 

|-
! 

|-
! 

|-
! 
| colspan=3 | None 
|  | New seat.New member elected.Jacksonian gain.
| nowrap | 

|}

Maryland 

|-
! 

|-
! 

|-
! 

|-
! 

|-
! 

|-
! 

|-
! 

|-
! 

|}

Massachusetts 

Elections were held April 1, 1833, after the term began but before the House convened in December 1833.  However, at least one district went to several ballots into early 1834.

|-
! 
| Benjamin Gorham
|  | Anti-Jacksonian
| 1820 1822 1827 
|  | Incumbent retired.New member elected.Anti-Jacksonian hold.
| nowrap | 

|-
! 
| Benjamin Crowninshield
|  | Jacksonian
| 1823
|  | Incumbent lost re-election.New member elected.Anti-Jacksonian gain.
| nowrap | 

|-
! 
| Jeremiah Nelson
|  | Anti-Jacksonian
| 1832 
|  | Incumbent retired.New member elected late on the third ballot.Jacksonian gain.
| nowrap | :::

|-
! 
| Edward Everett
|  | Anti-Jacksonian
| 1830
| Incumbent re-elected.
| nowrap | 

|-
! 
| John Davis
|  | Anti-Jacksonian
| 1824
| Incumbent re-elected.
| nowrap | 

|-
! 
| George Grennell Jr.
|  | Anti-Jacksonian
| 1828
| Incumbent re-elected.
| nowrap | 

|-
! 

|-
! 
| Isaac C. Bates
|  | Anti-Jacksonian
| 1826
| Incumbent re-elected.
| nowrap | 

|-
! 
| Henry Dearborn
|  | Anti-Jacksonian
| 1830
|  | Incumbent lost re-election.New member elected late on the eighth ballot.Anti-Masonic gain.
| nowrap | ::::::::

|-
! 
| James L. Hodges
|  | Anti-Jacksonian
| 1827
|  | Incumbent retired.New member elected.Anti-Jacksonian hold.
| nowrap | 

|-
! 

|-
! 
| John Quincy Adams
|  | Anti-Jacksonian
| 1830
|  |Incumbent re-elected from a new party.Anti-Masonic gain.
| nowrap | 

|}

Mississippi 

Elections held early, on August 6, 1832.

|-
! rowspan=2 | 2 seats on a general ticket
| Franklin E. Plummer
|  | Jacksonian
| 1830
| Incumbent re-elected.
| nowrap rowspan=2 | 
|-
| colspan=3 | None 
|  | New seat.New member elected.Jacksonian gain.

|}

Missouri 

|-
! rowspan=2 | 

|}

New Hampshire 

|-
! rowspan=9 | 
| John Brodhead
|  | Jacksonian
| 1829
|  | Incumbent retired.New member elected.Jacksonian hold.
| rowspan=5 nowrap | 

|-
| Thomas Chandler
|  | Jacksonian
| 1829
|  | Incumbent retired.New member elected.Jacksonian hold.

|-
| Joseph Hammons
|  | Jacksonian
| 1829
|  | Incumbent retired.New member elected.Jacksonian hold.

|-
| Joseph M. Harper
|  | Jacksonian
| 1831
| Incumbent re-elected.

|-
| Henry Hubbard
|  | Jacksonian
| 1829
| Incumbent re-elected.

|}

New Jersey 

|-
! rowspan=6 | 

|}

New York 

New York elected its 40 members from November 5 to 7, 1832. It gained seven members from reapportionment. Two members were elected in the 8th, 17th, 22nd, and 23rd districts, while four members were elected in the 3rd district on a general ticket.

|-
! 
| James Lent
|  | Jacksonian
| 1828
|  | Incumbent retired.New member elected.Jacksonian hold.
| nowrap | 

|-
! 
| John T. Bergen
|  | Jacksonian
| 1830
|  | Incumbent retired.New member elected.Jacksonian hold.
| nowrap | 

|-
! rowspan=4 | 
| Churchill C. Cambreleng
|  | Jacksonian
| 1821
| Incumbent re-elected.
| rowspan=4 nowrap | 
|-
| Campbell P. White
|  | Jacksonian
| 1828
| Incumbent re-elected.
|-
| Gulian C. Verplanck
|  | Jacksonian
| 1824
|  | Incumbent retired.New member elected.Jacksonian hold.
|-
| colspan=3 | None 
|  | New seat.New member elected.Jacksonian gain.

|-
! 
| Aaron Ward
|  | Jacksonian
| 1830
| Incumbent re-elected.
| nowrap | 

|-
! 
| Edmund H. Pendleton
|  | Anti-Jacksonian
| 1830
|  | Incumbent lost re-election.New member elected.Jacksonian gain.
| nowrap | 

|-
! 
| Samuel J. Wilkin
|  | Anti-Jacksonian
| 1830
|  | Incumbent lost re-election.New member elected.Jacksonian gain.
| nowrap | 

|-
! 
| John C. Brodhead
|  | Jacksonian
| 1830
|  | Incumbent retired.New member elected.Jacksonian hold.
| nowrap | 

|-
! rowspan=2 | 
| John King
|  | Jacksonian
| 1830
|  | Incumbent retired.New member elected.Jacksonian hold.
| rowspan=2 nowrap | 
|-
| colspan=3 | None 
|  | New seat.New member elected.Jacksonian gain.

|-
! 
| Job Pierson
|  | Jacksonian
| 1830
| Incumbent re-elected.
| nowrap | 

|-
! 
| Gerrit Y. Lansing
|  | Jacksonian
| 1830
| Incumbent re-elected.
| nowrap | 

|-
! 
| John W. Taylor
|  | Anti-Jacksonian
| 1812
|  | Incumbent lost re-election.New member elected.Jacksonian gain.
| nowrap | 

|-
! 
| Joseph Bouck
|  | Jacksonian
| 1830
|  | Incumbent retired.New member elected.Anti-Masonic gain.
| nowrap | 

|-
! 
| William G. Angel
|  | Jacksonian
| 1828
|  | Incumbent retired.New member elected.Jacksonian hold.
| nowrap | 

|-
! 
| Erastus Root
|  | Jacksonian
| 1830
|  | Incumbent retired.New member elected.Jacksonian hold.
| nowrap | 

|-
! 
| Michael Hoffman
|  | Jacksonian
| 1824
|  | Incumbent retired.New member elected.Jacksonian hold.
| nowrap | 

|-
! 
| Nathan Soule
|  | Jacksonian
| 1830
|  | Incumbent retired.New member elected.Jacksonian hold.
| nowrap | 

|-
! rowspan=2 | 
| Samuel Beardsley
|  | Jacksonian
| 1830
| Incumbent re-elected.
| rowspan=2 nowrap | 
|-
| Nathaniel Pitcher
|  | Jacksonian
| 1830
|  | Incumbent retired.New member elected.Jacksonian hold.

|-
! 
| Daniel Wardwell
|  | Jacksonian
| 1830
| Incumbent re-elected.
| nowrap | 

|-
! 
| William Hogan
|  | Jacksonian
| 1830
|  | Incumbent lost renomination.New member elected.Jacksonian hold.
| nowrap | 

|-
! 
| John A. Collier
|  | Anti-Masonic
| 1830
|  | Incumbent lost re-election.New member elected.Jacksonian gain.
| nowrap | 

|-
! 
| Charles Dayan
|  | Jacksonian
| 1830
|  | Incumbent retired.New member elected.Jacksonian hold.
| nowrap | 

|-
! rowspan=2 | 
| Edward C. Reed
|  | Jacksonian
| 1830
|  | Incumbent retired.New member elected.Jacksonian hold.
| rowspan=2 nowrap | 
|-
| Gamaliel H. Barstow
|  | Anti-Masonic
| 1830
|  | Incumbent lost re-election.New member elected.Jacksonian gain.

|-
! rowspan=2 | 
| Freeborn G. Jewett
|  | Jacksonian
| 1830
|  | Incumbent retired.New member elected.Jacksonian hold.
| rowspan=2 nowrap | 
|-
| colspan=3 | None 
|  | New seat.New member elected.Jacksonian gain.

|-
! 
| Ulysses F. Doubleday
|  | Jacksonian
| 1830
|  | Incumbent retired.New member elected.Jacksonian hold.
| nowrap | 

|-
! 
| William Babcock
|  | Anti-Masonic
| 1830
|  | Incumbent retired.New member elected.Jacksonian gain.
| nowrap | 

|-
! 
| John Dickson
|  | Anti-Masonic
| 1830
| Incumbent re-elected.
| nowrap | 

|-
! 
| Grattan H. Wheeler
|  | Anti-Masonic
| 1830
|  | Incumbent retired.New member elected.Jacksonian gain.
| nowrap | 

|-
! 
| Frederick Whittlesey
|  | Anti-Masonic
| 1830
| Incumbent re-elected.
| nowrap | 

|-
! 
| Phineas L. Tracy
|  | Anti-Masonic
| 1827 
|  | Incumbent retired.New member elected.Anti-Masonic hold.
| nowrap | 

|-
! 
| Bates Cooke
|  | Anti-Masonic
| 1830
|  | Incumbent retired.New member elected.Anti-Masonic hold.
| nowrap | 

|-
! 
| colspan=3 | None 
|  | New seat.New member elected.Anti-Masonic gain.
| nowrap | 

|-
! 
| colspan=3 | None 
|  | New seat.New member elected.Anti-Masonic gain.
| nowrap | 

|-
! 
| colspan=3 | None 
|  | New seat.New member elected.Anti-Masonic gain.
| nowrap | 
|}

North Carolina 

|-
! 

|-
! 

|-
! 

|-
! 

|-
! 

|-
! 

|-
! 

|-
! 

|-
! 

|-
! 

|-
! 

|-
! 
| Samuel Price Carson
|  | Jacksonian
| 1825
|  | Incumbent lost re-election.New member elected.Anti-Jacksonian gain.
| nowrap | 

|-
! 

|}

Ohio 

|-
! 

|-
! 

|-
! 

|-
! 

|-
! 

|-
! 

|-
! 

|-
! 

|-
! 

|-
! 

|-
! 

|-
! 

|-
! 

|-
! 

|-
! 

|-
! 

|-
! 

|-
! 

|-
! 

|}

Pennsylvania 

Following the reapportionment resulting from the 1830 census, Pennsylvania gained two representatives, increasing from 26 to 28, and was redistricted into 25 districts, two of which were plural districts. Pennsylvania elected its members October 9, 1832.

|-
! 
| Joel B. Sutherland
|  | Jacksonian
| 1826
| Incumbent re-elected.Winner resigned to become a judge but then won re-election to the seat.
| nowrap | 

|-
! rowspan=2 | 
| Henry Horn
|  | Jacksonian
| 1830
|  | Incumbent lost re-election.New member elected.Anti-Jacksonian gain.
| rowspan=2 nowrap | 

|-
| colspan=3 | None (Seat created)
|  | New seat.New member elected.Anti-Jacksonian gain.

|-
! 
| John G. Watmough
|  | Anti-Jacksonian
| 1830
| Incumbent re-elected.
| nowrap | 

|-
! rowspan=3 | 
| William Hiester
|  | Anti-Masonic
| 1830
| Incumbent re-elected.
| rowspan=3 nowrap | 

|-
| Joshua Evans Jr.
|  | Jacksonian
| 1828
|  | Incumbent retired.New member elected.Anti-Masonic gain.

|-
| David Potts Jr.
|  | Anti-Masonic
| 1830
| Incumbent re-elected.

|-
! 
| Joel K. Mann
|  | Jacksonian
| 1830
| Incumbent re-elected.
| nowrap | 

|-
! 
| colspan=3 | None (District created)
|  | New seat.New member elected.Jacksonian gain.
| nowrap | 

|-
! 
| Peter Ihrie Jr.
|  | Jacksonian
| 1829 
|  | Incumbent lost re-election.New member elected.Jacksonian hold
| nowrap | 

|-
! 
| Henry King
|  | Jacksonian
| 1830
| Incumbent re-elected.
| nowrap | 

|-
! 
| Henry A. P. Muhlenberg
|  | Jacksonian
| 1828
| Incumbent re-elected.
| nowrap | 

|-
! 
| John C. Bucher
|  | Jacksonian
| 1830
|  | Incumbent lost re-election.New member elected.Anti-Masonic gain.
| nowrap | 

|-
! 
| Adam King
|  | Jacksonian
| 1826
|  | Incumbent lost re-election.New member elected.Anti-Masonic gain.
| nowrap | 

|-
! 
| Thomas H. Crawford
|  | Jacksonian
| 1828
|  | Incumbent lost re-election.New member elected.Anti-Masonic gain.
| nowrap | 

|-
! 
| colspan=3 | None (District created)
|  | New seat.New member elected.Jacksonian gain.
| nowrap | 

|-
! 
| colspan=3 | None (District created)
|  | New seat.New member elected.Jacksonian gain.
| nowrap | 

|-
! 
| colspan=3 | None (District created)
|  | New seat.New member elected.Jacksonian gain.
| nowrap | 

|-
! 
| colspan=3 | None (District created)
|  | New seat.New member elected.Jacksonian gain.
| nowrap | 

|-
! 
| colspan=3 | None (District created)
|  | New seat.New member elected.Jacksonian gain.
| nowrap | 

|-
! 
| George Burd
|  | Anti-Jacksonian
| 1830
| Incumbent re-elected.
| nowrap | 

|-
! 
| Richard Coulter
|  | Jacksonian
| 1826
| Incumbent re-elected.
| nowrap | 

|-
! 
| Andrew Stewart
|  | Anti-Masonic
| 18201828 1830
| Incumbent re-elected.
| nowrap | 

|-
! 
| Thomas M. T. McKennan
|  | Anti-Masonic
| 1830
| Incumbent re-elected.
| nowrap | 

|-
! 
| Harmar Denny
|  | Anti-Masonic
| 1829 
| Incumbent re-elected.
| nowrap | 

|-
! 
| colspan=3 | None (District created)
|  | New seat.New member elected.Jacksonian gain.
| nowrap | 

|-
! 
| John Banks
|  | Anti-Masonic
| 1830
| Incumbent re-elected.
| nowrap | 

|-
! 
| colspan=3 | None (District created)
|  | New seat.New member elected.Jacksonian gain.
| nowrap | 

|}

Rhode Island 

! rowspan=2 | 

|}

South Carolina 

|-
! 

|-
! 

|-
! 

|-
! 

|-
! 

|-
! 

|-
! 

|-
! 

|-
! 

|}

Tennessee 

Elections held late, from August 1 to August 2, 1833.

|-
! rowspan=2 | 
| John Blair
|  | Jacksonian
| 1823
| Incumbent re-elected.
| rowspan=2 nowrap | 
|-
| Thomas D. Arnold
|  | Anti-Jacksonian
| 1831

|-
! 
| Thomas D. Arnold
|  | Anti-Jacksonian
| 1831
|  |Incumbent redistricted to the .New member elected.Jacksonian gain.
| nowrap | 

|-
! 
| James I. Standifer
|  | Jacksonian
| 1829
|  |Incumbent redistricted to the .New member elected.Jacksonian hold.
| nowrap | 

|-
! rowspan=2 | 
| Jacob C. Isacks
|  | Jacksonian
| 1823
|  |Incumbent redistricted to the .New member elected.Jacksonian hold.
| nowrap rowspan=2 | 
|-
| James I. Standifer
|  | Jacksonian
| 1829

|-
! rowspan=2 | 
| William Hall
|  | Jacksonian
| 1831
|  | Incumbent retired.New member elected.Jacksonian hold.
| nowrap rowspan=2 | 
|-
| Jacob C. Isacks
|  | Jacksonian
| 1823

|-
! 
| James K. Polk
|  | Jacksonian
| 1825
|  |Incumbent redistricted to the .New member elected.Jacksonian hold.
| nowrap | 

|-
! 
| John Bell
|  | Jacksonian
| 1827
| Incumbent re-elected.
| nowrap | 

|-
! 
| Cave Johnson
|  | Jacksonian
| 1829
|  | Incumbent redistricted to the .New member elected.Jacksonian hold.
| nowrap | 

|-
! rowspan=2 | 
| William Fitzgerald
|  | Jacksonian
| 1831 
|  | Incumbent redistricted to the .New member elected.Jacksonian hold. 
| nowrap rowspan=2 | 
|-
| James K. Polk
|  | Jacksonian
| 1825

|-
! 
| colspan=3 | None (District created)
|  | New seat.New member elected.Jacksonian gain.
| nowrap | 

|-
! 
| Cave Johnson
|  | Jacksonian
| 1829 
|  | Incumbent redistricted from the .Jacksonian gain.
| nowrap | 

|-
! 
| William Fitzgerald
|  | Jacksonian
| 1831 
|  | Incumbent redistricted from the .New member elected.Anti-Jacksonian gain.
| nowrap | 

|-
! 
| colspan=3 | None (District created)
|  | New seat.New member elected.Jacksonian gain.
| nowrap | 

|}

Vermont 

Vermont elected its members January 1, 1833, but two were elected late in the Spring of 1833. The 's election in the previous cycle (1830–1831) went to eleven ballots, so its member wasn't elected until the 1832, near the beginning of this cycle (1832–1833).

|-
! 
| Jonathan Hunt
|  | Anti-Jacksonian
| 1827
|  | Incumbent died May 15, 1832.New member elected.Winner also elected the same day to finish the current term.
| nowrap | 

|-
! 
| William Slade
|  | Anti-Masonic
| 1831 
| Incumbent re-elected.
| nowrap | 

|-
! 
| Horace Everett
|  | Anti-Jacksonian
| 1828
| Incumbent re-elected on the third ballot.
| nowrap | :::

|-
! 
| Heman Allen
|  | Anti-Jacksonian
| 1832 
| Incumbent re-elected.
| nowrap | 

|-
! 
| William Cahoon
|  | Anti-Masonic
| 1829
|  | Incumbent lost re-election.New member elected on the second ballot.Anti-Masonic hold.
| nowrap | ::

|}

Virginia 

|-
! 

|-
! 

|-
! 

|-
! 

|-
! 

|-
! 

|-
! 

|-
! 

|-
! 

|-
! 

|-
! 

|-
! 

|-
! 

|-
! 

|-
! 

|-
! 

|-
! 

|-
! 

|-
! 

|-
! 

|-
! 

|}

Non-voting delegates

Arkansas Territory 

|-
! 
| Ambrose H. Sevier
|  | Jacksonian
| 1828 
| Incumbent re-elected on an unknown date.
| nowrap | 

|}

Florida Territory 

|-
! 
| Joseph M. White
|  | Jacksonian
| 1825
| Incumbent re-elected on an unknown date.
| nowrap | 

|}

Michigan Territory 

|-
! 
| Austin Eli Wing
|  | Jacksonian
| 1830 or 1831
|  | Incumbent retired.New delegate elected on an unknown date.Jacksonian hold.
| nowrap | 

|}

See also 
 1832 United States elections
 List of United States House of Representatives elections (1824–1854)
 1832 United States presidential election
 1832–33 United States Senate elections
 22nd United States Congress
 23rd United States Congress

Notes

References

Bibliography

External links 
 Office of the Historian (Office of Art & Archives, Office of the Clerk, U.S. House of Representatives)